Marlin Andrew Stutzman (born August 31, 1976) is an American politician who was a member of the United States House of Representatives, representing Indiana's 3rd congressional district, from 2010 to 2017. A Republican, Stutzman previously served as a member of the Indiana House of Representatives from 2002 to 2008, representing district 52, and as a member of the Indiana Senate, representing the 13th district, from 2009 to 2010.

Stutzman was a candidate in the 2010 U.S. Senate election, but was defeated in the primary election in May 2010 by former Senator Dan Coats.

Early life, education and career
Stutzman is a fourth-generation farmer who grew up on a farm located in both St. Joseph County, Michigan and LaGrange County, Indiana. He graduated from Lake Area Christian High School located in Sturgis, Michigan in 1994. He attended Glen Oaks Community College (in 1999) and Tri-State University, currently known as Trine University (from 2005–07). He did not graduate from either school. As co-owner with his father, Albert, he runs Stutzman Farms, farming  in the Michiana area. He is also owner of Stutzman Farms Trucking.

State politics

 2002–2008, Representative, Indiana State House, District 52
 2005–2008, Special Assistant, Rep. Mark Souder, District 3
 2009–2010, Senator, Indiana State Senate, District 13 (includes Kosciusko, LaGrange, Noble, Steuben and DeKalb counties)

First elected to the Indiana House of Representatives in 2002 at the age of 26, Stutzman served as the youngest member of the legislature until 2006. In 2009, he was elected to the Indiana Senate representing the 13th district. He ran for the Republican nomination for the 2010 U.S. Senate election in a bid to replace retiring incumbent Evan Bayh.

Committees
 Commerce, Public Policy & Interstate Cooperation
 Pensions & Labor
 Utilities & Technology – Ranking Member 
 Natural Resources

Legislation
 Alternative Energy Incentive – Sponsor 2009
 Reduce Government Inefficiencies & Waste – Co-Author 2002
 Truth in Sentencing Amendment – Author
 Military Family Relief Fund – Author 2007
 SB 528: Indiana School Scholarship Tax Credit – Author

U.S. House of Representatives

Committee assignments
 Committee on Financial Services
 Subcommittee on Financial Institutions and Consumer Credit
 Subcommittee on Monetary Policy and Trade

Caucus memberships
 Congressional Constitution Caucus (Co-Chair)

Stutzman was elected in a November 2, 2010 special election to fill the rest of resigning Representative Mark Souder's term. He was simultaneously elected to a full two-year term to expire in 2013.

Political positions

Stutzman consistently received 90% ratings or above from the Chamber of Commerce and other small business associations for his support of pro-business legislation.  In 2008 he won the Small Business Champion Award  from the Indiana Chamber of Commerce. He was cited as a Taxpayer Friendly State Legislators by Indiana WatchDog  an independent, volunteer organization.

He served as the ranking member of the Indiana State Senate Utilities and Technology Committee and helped to pass alternative energy incentive legislation in Indiana.

In 2006 he served as the chairman of the Indiana Public Policy Committee taking strong stands for conservative values on controversial issues.

Government waste
Stutzman advocates for more accountability in state government operations. He co-authored a bill to establish the Hoosier Grace Commission which passed in 2003. The commission helped eliminate wasteful state government spending and has brought fraud and/or scandals to public awareness.

Affordable Care Act
In Congress, Stutzman has opposed the Patient Protection and Affordable Care Act. In September 2013, he advocated attaching a measure defunding the Act to must-pass legislation funding the federal government.

After the government subsequently shut down, Stutzman remarked that the issue at stake was no longer merely the Patient Protection and Affordable Care Act, and Republicans would need some concession in order to reopen the government.

Taxes
In 2010, Stutzman signed a pledge sponsored by Americans for Prosperity promising to vote against any Global Warming legislation that would raise taxes.

Political campaigns

2010 U.S. Senate campaign

Stutzman ran for the U.S. Senate seat vacated by incumbent Evan Bayh. He lost to former U.S. Senator Dan Coats in the primary.

2010 U.S. House campaign

Incumbent U.S. Representative Mark Souder (R) resigned after admitting to an affair. This event occurred after he won the Republican primary on May 4. On June 12, Republicans from Indiana's third district met in Columbia City to choose Souder's replacement.  Stutzman won decisively on the second ballot. He defeated the Democratic candidate in both the general election and the special election to fill the remainder of Souder's term (both held on the same day).

2012 U.S. House campaign
Stutzman defeated his Democratic opponent Kevin Boyd by a 67%–33% margin.

2014 U.S. House campaign 
Stutzman defeated his Democratic opponent Justin Kuhnle by 66% - 27% margin. Libertarian candidate Scott Wise received 7%.

2016 U.S. Senate campaign

Stutzman ran for a U.S. Senate seat in 2016. He was endorsed by the Club for Growth and Senator Rand Paul. Stutzman was defeated by fellow Republican Todd Young in the primary election.

Electoral history

Personal life
Stutzman and his wife, Christy, have two sons, Payton and Preston. On May 8, 2018, Christy Stutzman won the Republican primary to represent Indiana's 49th State House district. On November 6, 2018, Christy was elected to the State House.

References

External links
 
 
 

|-

|-

|-

1976 births
Christians from Indiana
Christians from Michigan
Farmers from Indiana
Republican Party Indiana state senators
Living people
Republican Party members of the Indiana House of Representatives
People from LaGrange County, Indiana
People from Sturgis, Michigan
Trine University alumni
21st-century American politicians
Republican Party members of the United States House of Representatives from Indiana